Border reivers were raiders along the Anglo-Scottish border from the late 13th century to the beginning of the 17th century. They included both Scottish and English people, and they raided the entire border country without regard to their victims' nationality. Their heyday was in the last hundred years of their existence, during the time of the House of Stuart in the Kingdom of Scotland and the House of Tudor in the Kingdom of England.

Background

Scotland and England were frequently at war during the late Middle Ages. During these wars, the livelihood of the people on the Borders was devastated by the contending armies. Even when the countries were not formally at war, tension remained high, and royal authority in either or both kingdoms was often weak, particularly in remote locations. The difficulty and uncertainties of basic human survival meant that communities and/or people kindred to each other would seek security through group strength and cunning. They would attempt to improve their livelihoods at their nominal enemies' expense, enemies who were frequently also just trying to survive. Loyalty to a feeble or distant monarch and reliance on the effectiveness of the law usually made people a target for depredations rather than conferring any security.

There were other factors which may have promoted a predatory mode of living in parts of the Borders. A system of partible inheritance is evident in some parts of the English side of the Borders in the sixteenth century. By contrast to primogeniture, this meant that land was divided equally among all sons following a father's death; it could mean that the inheriting generation held insufficient land on which to survive. Also, much of the Border region is mountainous or open moorland, unsuitable for arable farming but good for grazing. Livestock was easily rustled and driven by mounted reivers who knew the country well. The raiders might also remove easily portable household goods or valuables, and take prisoners for ransom.

The attitudes of the English and Scottish governments towards the border families alternated from indulgence and even encouragement, as these fierce families served as the first line of defence against invasion across the border, to draconian and indiscriminate punishment when their lawlessness became intolerable to the authorities.

Reive, a noun meaning raid, comes from the Middle English (Scots) reifen. The verb reave meaning "plunder, rob", a closely related word, comes from the Middle English reven. There also exists a Northumbrian and Scots verb reifen. All three derive from Old English rēafian which means "to rob, plunder, pillage". Variants of these words were used in the Borders in the later Middle Ages. The corresponding verb in Dutch is "(be)roven", and "(be)rauben" in German.

The earliest use of the combined term 'border reiver' appears to be by Sir Walter Scott in his anthology Minstrelsy of the Scottish Border. George Ridpath (1716?–1772), the author of posthumously-published The Border-History of England and Scotland, deduced from the earliest times to the union of the two crowns (London, 1776), referred not to 'border reivers' but only to banditti.

Nature

The reivers were both English and Scottish and raided both sides of the border impartially, so long as the people they raided had no powerful protectors and no connection to their own kin. Their activities, although usually within a day's ride of the border, extended both north and south of their main haunts. English raiders were reported to have hit the outskirts of Edinburgh, and Scottish raids were reported to have reached as far south as Lancashire and Yorkshire. The main raiding season ran through the early winter months, when the nights were longest and the cattle and horses fat from having spent the summer grazing. The numbers involved in a raid might range from a few dozen to organised campaigns involving up to three thousand riders.

When raiding, or riding, as it was termed, the reivers rode light on hardy nags or ponies renowned for the ability to pick their way over the boggy moss lands (see: Galloway pony, Hobelar). The original dress of a shepherd's plaid was later replaced by light armour such as brigandines or jacks of plate (a type of sleeveless doublet into which small plates of steel were stitched), and metal helmets such as burgonets or morions; hence their nickname of the "steel bonnets". They were armed with light lances and small shields, and sometimes also with longbows, or light crossbows, known as "latches", or later on in their history with one or more pistols. They invariably also carried swords and dirks.

Borderers as soldiers
Border reivers were sometimes in demand as mercenary soldiers, owing to their recognised skills as light cavalry. Reivers sometimes served in English or Scottish armies in the Low Countries and in Ireland, often to avoid having harsher penalties enacted upon themselves and their families. Reivers fighting as levied soldiers played important roles in the battles at Flodden and Solway Moss. After meeting one reiver (the Bold Buccleugh), Queen Elizabeth I is quoted as having said that "with ten thousand such men, James VI could shake any throne in Europe."

These borderers proved difficult to control, however, within larger national armies. They were already in the habit of claiming any nationality or none, depending on who was asking and where they perceived the individual advantage to be. Many had relatives on both sides of Scottish-English conflicts despite prevailing laws against international marriage. They could be badly behaved in camp, seeing fellow soldiers as sources of plunder. As warriors more loyal to clans than to nations, their commitment to the work was always in doubt. At battles such as Ancrum Moor in Scotland in 1545, borderers changed sides in mid-combat to curry favour with the likely victors. At the Battle of Pinkie Cleugh in 1547, an observer (William Patten) noticed Scottish and English borderers chatting with each other, then putting on a spirited show of combat once they knew they had been spotted.

Dwellings and fortifications

The inhabitants of the Borders had to live in a state of constant alert, and for self-protection, they built fortified tower houses.

In the very worst periods of warfare, people were unable to construct more than crude turf cabins, the destruction of which would be little loss. When times allowed, however, they built houses designed as much for defence as shelter. The bastle house was a stout two-storeyed building. The lower floor was used to keep the most valuable livestock and horses. The upper storey housed the people, and often could be reached only by an external ladder which was pulled up at night or if danger threatened. Only narrow arrow slits provided light and ventilation. Such dwellings could not be set on fire, and while they could be captured, for example by smoking out the defenders with fires of damp straw or using scaling ladders to reach the roof, they were usually not worth the time and effort.

Peel towers (also spelled pele towers) were usually three-storeyed buildings, constructed specifically for defensive purposes by the authorities, or for prestigious individuals such as the heads of clans. Smailholm Tower is one of many surviving peel towers. Like bastle houses, they were very strongly constructed for defence. If necessary, they could be temporarily abandoned and stuffed full of smouldering turf to prevent an enemy (such as a government army) destroying them with gunpowder.

Peel towers and bastle houses were often surrounded by a stone wall known as a barmkin, inside which cattle and other livestock were kept overnight.

Law and order

A special body of law, known as March law or Border law, developed in the region. Under border law, a person who had been raided had the right to mount a counter-raid within six days, even across the border, to recover his goods. This "hot trod" had to proceed with "hound and horne, hew and cry", making a racket and carrying a piece of burning turf on a spear point to openly announce their purpose, to distinguish themselves from unlawful raiders proceeding covertly. They might use a sleuth hound (also known as a "slew dogge") to follow raiders' tracks. These dogs were valuable, and part of the established forces (on the English side of the border, at least). Any person meeting this counter-raid was required to ride along and offer such help as he could, on pain of being considered complicit with the raiders. The "cold trod" mounted after six days required official sanction. Officers such as the Deputy Warden of the English West March had the specific duty of "following the trod".

Both sides of the border were divided into Marches, each under a march warden. The march wardens' various duties included the maintenance of patrols, watches and garrisons to deter raiding from the other kingdom. On occasion, march wardens could make warden roades to recover loot, and to make a point to raiders and officials.

The march wardens also had the duty of maintaining such justice and equity as was possible. The respective kingdoms' march wardens would meet at appointed times along the border itself to settle claims against people on their side of the border by people from the other kingdom. These occasions, known as "Days of Truce", were much like fairs, with entertainment and much socialising. For reivers it was an opportunity to meet (lawfully) with relatives or friends normally separated by the border. It was not unknown for violence to break out even at such truce days.

March wardens (and the lesser officers such as keepers of fortified places) were rarely effective at maintaining the law. The Scottish wardens were usually borderers themselves, and were complicit in raiding. They almost invariably showed favour to their own kindred, which caused jealousy and even hatred among other Scottish border families. Many English officers were from southern counties in England and often could not command the loyalty or respect of their locally recruited subordinates or the local population. Local officers such as Sir John Forster, who was Warden of the Middle March for almost 35 years, became quite as well known for venality as his most notorious Scottish counterparts.

By the death of Elizabeth I of England, things had come to such a pitch along the border that the English government considered re-fortifying and rebuilding Hadrian's Wall. When Elizabeth died, there was an especially violent outbreak of raiding known as "Ill Week", resulting from the convenient belief that the laws of a kingdom were suspended between the death of a sovereign and the proclamation of the successor. Upon his accession to the English throne, James VI of Scotland (who became James I of England) moved hard against the reivers, abolishing border law and the very term "Borders" in favour of "Middle Shires", and dealing out stern justice to reivers.

Legislation
In 1606 an act (4 Jas. 1. c. 1) to assist the recent Union of the Crowns was enacted; it was long titled An act for the utter abolition of all memory of hostility, and the dependence thereof, between England and Scotland, and for repressing of occasions of disorders, and disorders in time to come. The act repealed nine English laws enacted over the previous centuries and considered hostile to Scotland; the repeal became effective when 13 Scottish laws considered hostile to England had been repealed. Three years later an act (7 Jas. 1 c. 1) dealing with criminal law in the border region was enacted; it was long titled An act for the better execution of justice, and suppressing of criminal offenders, in the north parts of the kingdom of England. To deal with cross-border flight, the act allowed the trial of an Englishman in Scotland if the felony was committed there, and he was later arrested in England; it became effective after a similar act had been passed in Scotland.

Following the Restoration and long-running lawlessness by Moss troopers nearly six decades later, parliament passed the Moss Troopers Act 1662 (13 & 14 Cha. 2. c. 22) for the border area; it was long titled An Act for preventing of Theft and Rapine upon the Northern Borders of England. Section seven of the act revives both previous acts passed under James I. With the 1662 act about to expire, the sixth session of Cavalier Parliament passed the Moss Troopers Act 1666 (18 Cha. 2 c. 3), long titled An Act to continue a former Act for preventing of Thefte and Rapine upon the Northerne Borders of England. Under section two of the act, the benefit of clergy was taken away from those convicted (generally meaning a death sentence), or otherwise, the notorious thieves and spoil-takers in Northumberland or Cumberland were to be transported to America, "there to remaine and not to returne".

Generally associated with several historic events of the period, as well as continuing lawlessness, or the consideration of insufficient government control to prevent "theft and rapine upon the northern borders of England", these acts were repeatedly continued over the next 80 years. The initial acts include the Moss Trooper Acts of 1677 (29 & 30 Cha. 2 c. 2), 1685 (1 Jas. 2 c. 14), 1695 (7 & 8 Will. 3 c. 17), 1700 (12 & 13 Will. 3 c. 6), and 1712 (12 Ann. c. 10). Starting in 1732, although the 'Moss trooper' short title was dropped, the enforcement acts were continued by other variously named acts, most of which continued the established descriptive phrase "for preventing theft and rapine upon the northern borders of England", as the first item included. These later acts include the Perpetuation of Various Laws Act 1732 (6 Geo. 2 c. 37), the Universities (Wine Licences) Act 1743 (17 Geo. 2 c. 40), and the Continuance of Acts, 1750 (24 Geo. 2 c. 57), which continued previous acts until 1 September 1757 "and from thence to the end of the then next session of parliament".

Border surnames and clans

A variety of terms describe the Border families, such as the "Riding Surnames" and the "Graynes" thereof. This can be equated to the system of the Highland Clans and their septs. e.g. Clan Donald and Clan MacDonald of Sleat, can be compared with the Scotts of Buccleuch and the Scotts of Harden and elsewhere. Both Border Graynes and Highland septs, however, had the essential feature of patriarchal leadership by the chief of the name, and had territories in which most of their kindred lived. Border families did practice customs similar to those of the Gaels, such as tutorship when an heir who was a minor succeeded to the chiefship, and giving bonds of manrent.

In an Act of the Scottish Parliament of 1587 there is the description of the "" – thus using the words 'clan' and 'chief' to describe both Highland and Lowland families. The act goes on to list the various Border clans. Later, Sir George MacKenzie of Rosehaugh, the Lord Advocate (Attorney General), writing in 1680 said "By the term 'chief' we call the representative of the family from the word chef or head and in the Irish (Gaelic) with us the chief of the family is called the head of the clan". Thus, the words chief or head, and clan or family, are interchangeable. It is therefore possible to talk of the MacDonald family or the Maxwell clan. The idea that Highlanders should be listed as clans while the Lowlanders are listed as families originated as a 19th-century convention.

Surnames in the Marches of Scotland (1587)

In 1587 the Parliament of Scotland passed a statute: "For the quieting and keping in obiedince of the disorderit subjectis inhabitantis of the borders hielands and Ilis." Attached to the statute was a Roll of surnames from both the Borders and Highlands. The Borders portion listed 17 '' with a Chief and their associated Marches:

Middle March
Elliot, Armstrong, Nixon, Crozier
West March
Scott, Bates, Little, Thompson, Glendenning, Irvine, Bell, Carruthers, Graham, Johnstone, Jardine, Moffat, and Latimer.

Of the Border Clans or Graynes listed on this roll, Elliot, Carruthers, Scott, Irvine, Graham, Johnstone, Jardine and Moffat are registered with the Court of Lord Lyon in Edinburgh as Scottish Clans (with a Chief), others such as Armstrong, Little and Bell are armigerous clans with no Chief, while such as Clan Blackadder, also an armigerous clan in the Middle Ages, later died out or lost their lands, and are unregistered with the Lyon Court.

The historic riding surnames recorded by George MacDonald Fraser in The Steel Bonnets (London: Harvill, 1989) are:

East March
 Scotland: Hume, Trotter, Dixon, Bromfield, Craw, Cranston.
 England: Forster, Selby, Gray, Dunn.
Middle March
 Scotland: Burns, Kerr, Young, Pringle, Davison, Gilchrist, Tait of East Teviotdale. Scott, Oliver, Turnbull, Rutherford of West Teviotdale. Armstrong, Croser, Elliot, Nixon, Douglas, Laidlaw, Routledge, Turner, Henderson of Liddesdale.
 England: Anderson, Potts, Reed, Hall, Hedley of Redesdale. Charlton, Robson, Dodd, Dodds, Milburn, Yarrow, Stapleton of Tynedale. Also Fenwick, Ogle, Heron, Witherington, Medford (later Mitford), Collingwood, Carnaby, Shaftoe, Ridley, Stokoe, Stamper, Wilkinson, Hunter, Huntley, Thompson, Jamieson.
West March
 Scotland: Bell, Irvine, Johnstone, Maxwell, Carlisle, Beattie, Little, Carruthers, Glendenning, Routledge, Moffat.
 England: Graham, Hetherington, Musgrave, Storey, Lowther, Curwen, Salkeld, Dacre, Harden, Hodgson, Routledge, Tailor, Noble.

Relationships between the Border clans varied from uneasy alliance to open, deadly feud. It took little to start a feud; a chance quarrel or misuse of office was sufficient. Feuds might continue for years until patched up in the face of invasion from the other kingdoms or when the outbreak of other feuds caused alliances to shift. The border was easily destabilised if Graynes from opposite sides of the border were at feud. Feuds also provided ready excuse for particularly murderous raids or pursuits.

Riders did not wear identifying tartans. The tradition of family tartans dates from the Victorian era and was inspired by the novels of Sir Walter Scott. The typical dress of reivers included Jack of plate, steel bonnets (helmets), and riding boots.

In literature 

The reivers were romanticised by writers such as Sir Walter Scott (Minstrelsy of the Scottish Border), although he also used the term Moss-trooper, which refers to seventeenth-century borderland brigands. Scott was himself a native of the borders, writing down histories which had been passed on in folk tradition or ballad.

English poet William Wordsworth's verse play The Borderers features border reivers (but does not use this term).

The stories of legendary border reivers like Kinmont Willie Armstrong were often retold in folk-song as Border ballads. There are also local legends, such as the "Dish of Spurs" which would be served to a border chieftain of the Charltons to remind him that the larder was empty and it was time to raid again. Scottish author Nigel Tranter revisited these themes in his historical and contemporary novels. Scottish Border poet, and Australian bush balladeer, Will H. Ogilvie (1869–1963) wrote several poems about the reivers, including "The reiver's heart" (1903), "The raiders" (1904), "Whaup o' the rede: a ballad of the border raiders" (1909), "Kirkhope Tower" (1913), and "Ho! for the blades of Harden". The Steel Bonnets (1971) by George MacDonald Fraser (1925-2008) describes life in the Anglo-Scottish border marches in the heyday of the border reivers.

Aftermath 
The names of the Reiver families are still very much apparent amongst the inhabitants of the Scottish Borders, Northumbria and Cumbria today. Reiving families (particularly those large or brutal enough to carry significant influence) have left the local population passionate about their territory on both sides of the Border. Newspapers have described the local cross-border rugby fixtures as 'annual re-runs of the bloody Battle of Otterburn'. Despite this there has been much cross-border migration since the Pacification of the Borders, and families that were once Scots now identify themselves as English and vice versa.

Hawick in Scotland holds an annual Reivers' festival as do the Schomberg Society in Kilkeel, Northern Ireland (the two often co-operate). The summer festival in the Borders town of Duns is headed by the "Reiver" and "Reiver's Lass", a young man and young woman elected from the inhabitants of the town and surrounding area. The Ulster-Scots Agency's first two leaflets from the 'Scots Legacy' series feature the story of the historic Ulster tartan and the origins of the kilt and the Border Reivers.

Borderers (particularly those banished by James VI of Scotland) took part in the plantation of Ulster becoming the people known as Ulster-Scots (Scotch-Irish in America). Reiver descendants can be found throughout Ulster with names such as Elliot, Armstrong, Beattie, Bell, Carruthers, Hume and Heron, Rutledge, and Turnbulls amongst others.

Border surnames can also be found throughout the major areas of Scotch-Irish settlement in the United States, and particularly in the Appalachian region. The historian David Hackett Fischer (1989) has shown in detail how the Anglo-Scottish border culture became rooted in parts of the United States, especially the Upland South. Author George MacDonald Fraser wryly observed or imagined Border traits and names among controversial people in modern American history: Presidents Lyndon B. Johnson and Richard Nixon, among others. It is also noted that, in 1969, a descendant of the Borderers, Neil Armstrong, was the first person to set foot on the moon. In 1972 Armstrong was made a freeman of the town of Langholm in Scotland, the home of his ancestors.

The artist Gordon Young created a public art work in Carlisle: Cursing Stone and Reiver Pavement, a nod to Gavin Dunbar, the Archbishop of Glasgow's 1525 Monition of Cursing. Names of Reiver families are set into the paving of a walkway which connects Tullie House Museum to Carlisle Castle under a main road, and part of the bishop's curse is displayed on a 14-ton granite boulder.

See also
 Debatable Lands
 History of Northumberland
 The Borderers (television series)

Notes

References

External links
 The Border reivers website
 The Border reivers
 Border reivers DNA Project
 Another Border reivers website
 The Routledge reivers
 The capture and rescue of Kinmont Willie Armstrong
 Borders map with surnames
List of reiver family surnames

Anglo-Scottish border
History of Europe
 
Cavalry
History of Cumberland
History of Cumbria
History of Northumberland
Military history of Cumbria
Military history of Northumberland
People associated with the Scottish Borders
History of the Scottish Borders
Tudor England